Daniel Alan Keighran,  (born 18 June 1983) is an Australian soldier and a recipient of the Victoria Cross for Australia, the highest award in the Australian honours system. Keighran was awarded the Victoria Cross for Australia for his actions in the Battle of Derapet on 24 August 2010, during the War in Afghanistan. He was presented with the medal by the Governor-General of Australia, Quentin Bryce, at a ceremony in Canberra on 1 November 2012. Keighran is the third soldier to be awarded the Victoria Cross for Australia, and the first member of the Royal Australian Regiment so awarded.

Early life
Keighran (pronounced: KEAR-ran) was born in Nambour, in the Sunshine Coast hinterland region of Queensland, on 18 June 1983. His family lived on a "forty-acre block" where his parents bred paint horses. His mother also taught dressage, and his father occasionally organised rodeo events. Keighran attended school in nearby Rosedale and graduated from high school in 2000. That year Keighran was a torchbearer for the 2000 Summer Olympics torch parade and received a Pierre de Coubertin Award in recognition of his "Olympic spirit".

Military career
Keighran joined the Australian Army in 2000. Prior to Afghanistan, he had served in East Timor and Iraq. He was promoted to lance corporal in 2005 while within Mortar Platoon of the Support Company, 6th Battalion, Royal Australian Regiment (6 RAR). In 2006 he deployed to Iraq as a Bushmaster Protected Mobility Vehicle driver, and in 2007 to Afghanistan with the Special Operations Task Group in the same role. He was promoted to corporal in 2009, and was posted to D Company, 6 RAR.

Victoria Cross for Australia

Keighran was awarded the Victoria Cross for his actions while serving with the 6th Battalion, Royal Australian Regiment, in a fire fight with insurgents during the Battle of Derapet on 24 August 2010, an action of Operation Slipper.

During the battle, Keighran "with complete disregard for his own safety" repeatedly exposed himself to enemy fire to draw fire away from a team treating a battle casualty (Keighran's friend Lance Corporal Jared MacKinney). Keighran's actions were key in allowing the Coalition forces to withdraw without further casualties.

Post-military career
Keighran now serves in the Australian Army Reserve posted to Army Headquarters. His civilian career was in the mining industry in Kalgoorlie, Western Australia, where he worked in the Frog's Leg Gold Mine until early 2015.

Honours and awards
Keighran's Victoria Cross for Australia and accompanying medal group are on loan to the Australian War Memorial for display in the Hall of Valour. Keighran from 2001 until 2011 wore the Presidential Unit Citation awarded by the United States.

Notes

References

External links
 TV coverage of presentation ceremony from the NewsOnABC official channel on YouTube
 Copyright photos of Keighran and his wife from the Australian Defence Image Library. (Copyright statement)

Living people
1983 births
Military personnel from Queensland
Australian Army soldiers
Australian military personnel of the Iraq War
Australian military personnel of the War in Afghanistan (2001–2021)
Australian recipients of the Victoria Cross
People from Kalgoorlie
People from Nambour, Queensland
Recipients of the Meritorious Unit Citation